Budawangia is a monotypic  genus of flowering plants in the family Ericaceae. The sole species is Budawangia gnidioides from New South Wales. The genus was formally described in 1992.

In 2015 it was proposed that Budawangia and the related genus Rupicola be merged into the larger genus Epacris, which was found to be paraphyletic to the former two.  Budawangia gnidioides would be renamed Epacris gnidioides. 
As at 2020, the Australian Plant Names Index lists "Epacris gnidioides (Summerh.) E.A.Br." as the accepted name for the Australian Plant Census.

References

Epacridoideae
Flora of New South Wales
Monotypic Ericaceae genera
Plants described in 1992